Lascia o raddoppia?  ("Leave it or double it?")<ref name="tvguide">Lo Bello, Non. (1963, 13–19 April). Rhubarb Every Thursday: Here's why Italian TV would rather bring back the bubonic plague than its own version of 'The 64,000 Question'''. TV GUIDE, pp 8–11</ref> is a game show that aired on Italian television from 1955 to 1959, considered the Italian version of The $64,000 Question. It was hosted by Mike Bongiorno with Edy Campagnoli as valletta (assistant).

Contestants were asked a series of questions on a particular subject that, if answered correctly, would advance them to a prize of Lit. 2,560,000 (about US$4,000 in 1959). The contestant could then stop and walk away with that amount or take a chance on another question with the possibility of doubling their winnings to Lit. 5,120,000 (just over US$8,000 in 1959).

Controversies
Since the programme aired on state-run RAI, the prize money came from the State treasury, making programme officials particularly sensitive to viewer reaction.

Contestants became overnight celebrities and received a high amount of coverage in the Italian press. Most received an average of 2,000 letters each week they were on the show.

Maria Luisa Garoppo, a 23-year-old contestant from North Italy who was quite knowledgeable about Greek drama, scandalized many newspaper editors by wearing a tight red dress that accentuated her 45-inch bust and 19-inch waistline. Garoppo responded to her fashion critics by saying "It's not my fault if God constructed me unlike a telephone pole". The programme coordinator subsequently paid her the prize money but removed her as a contestant, telling viewers she was "under doctor's care for emotional shock".

Paola Bolognani, an 18-year-old philosophy student, was known as "the Marilyn Monroe of Italian soccer" for her knowledge of the game. While she was a contestant, her photo appeared on 22 magazine covers and she received more than 20,000 letters, including 3,500 that were marriage proposals. Bolognani eventually won the top prize by tackling a tough three-part question on soccer, but while she was a contestant a newspaper published an article revealing that she had been an illegitimate child.

Famous fans of the program
Pope Pius XII was known to be a great fan of Lascia o raddoppia?''.

Exiled Egyptian King Farouk gave $4,000 to Marisa Zocchi, a 19-year-old contestant who said she would use her winnings to hire a full-time nurse for her sick mother. Zocchi, who had held the title of Miss Tuscany in 1954, had stopped at the $4,000 prize level, sobbing as she explained to viewers she wouldn't risk trying for the full prize for her mother's sake.

References

Italian game shows
1955 in Italian television
RAI original programming